Daniel Alexander Douthwaite (born 8 February 1997) is an English cricketer who plays for Glamorgan.

Born in Kingston upon Thames, Douthwaite attended Reed's School in Cobham, Surrey, then went on to Cardiff Metropolitan University, where he earned a degree in Sports Management.

He made his List A debut for Warwickshire against the West Indies A team in a tri-series warm-up match on 17 June 2018. He made his Twenty20 debut for the Marylebone Cricket Club in the 2018 MCC Tri-Nation Series against the Netherlands on 29 July 2018. He made his first-class debut on 26 March 2019, for Cardiff MCCU against Somerset, as part of the Marylebone Cricket Club University fixtures.

On 23 April 2019, he was signed by Glamorgan. Prior to being signed by Glamorgan, Douthwaite had scored his maiden century in first-class cricket, with 100 not out from 107 balls for Cardiff MCCU against Sussex.

References

External links
 

1997 births
Living people
People from Kingston upon Thames
People educated at Reed's School
Alumni of Cardiff Metropolitan University
English cricketers
Cardiff MCCU cricketers
Warwickshire cricketers
Marylebone Cricket Club cricketers
Glamorgan cricketers
Manchester Originals cricketers